Active duty, in contrast to reserve duty, is a full-time occupation as part of a military force. In the United Kingdom and the Commonwealth of Nations, the equivalent term is active service.

India
The Indian Armed Forces are considered to be one of the largest active service forces in the world, with almost 1.42 million Active Standing Army. An additional 2.20 million reserve forces can be activated in a few weeks depending on the situation under the order of the President of India who is the Commander and Chief of the Armed Forces of India. This does not include the additional 1 million troops of the Paramilitary who too are an active force whose full-time responsibility is to guard the sovereignty of the nation from internal and external threats.

Israel
In the Israel Defense Forces, there are two types of active duty: regular service, and active reserve duty (abbr. Shamap). Regular service refers to either mandatory service, according to the laws of Israel, or standing army service, which consists of paid NCOs and officers.

Active reserve service refers to the actual time in which reservists are called up. This varies from once every few years to a month every year. During active reserve duty, military law can be applied to reservists, similarly to regular soldiers.

Pakistan
The Pakistan Armed Forces are one of the largest active service forces in the world, with almost 654,000 full-time personnel, due to the complex and volatile nature of Pakistan's relationship with India and the Kashmir region, and its porous border with Afghanistan. An additional 550,000 part-time reservists can be activated in weeks depending on the situation, by order of the President of Pakistan who is the Commander and Chief of the Armed Forces of Pakistan. This does not include the additional 385,000 troops of the Civil Armed Forces who are also active forces whose full-time responsibility is to guard the external borders.

United States
In the United States military, active duty refers to military members who are currently serving on full-time status in their military capacity. Full-time status is not limited to members of the active components of the military services; members of any of the three components (active, reserve, and the National Guard) may be placed into active status. All personnel in the active components are in active status.  Reservists may be placed into active status as units or individuals.  Units may be mobilized in support of operations, such as the reserve units that have been deployed in support of the Global War on Terror or those called up within the United States to provide support to civil authorities. Individuals may be placed in active status as part of the Active Guard Reserve program, as augmentees to  active or reserve component units, or to attend full-time military training.

References

Military science